The Enforcer is a 1976 American neo-noir vigilante action thriller film and the third in the Dirty Harry film series. Directed by James Fargo, it stars Clint Eastwood as Inspector "Dirty" Harry Callahan, Tyne Daly as Inspector Kate Moore, and DeVeren Bookwalter as criminal mastermind Bobby Maxwell. It was also the last film in the series to feature John Mitchum as Inspector Frank DiGiorgio.

The film is memorable for containing more comedic dialogue than any other entry in the Dirty Harry franchise, as well as offering a more fleshed out partner for protagonist Callahan.

Plot 
In Marin County, two gas company men are lured by a scantily clad woman to a remote spot in Mill Valley, where both are killed by Bobby Maxwell. Maxwell leads a group of men and women calling themselves the People's Revolutionary Strike Force (PRSF), who pose as a terrorist organization to conceal the true purpose of their criminal activities.

Inspector Harry Callahan and his partner Frank DiGiorgio deal with a conman faking a heart attack at a restaurant before being called in to deal with a holdup at a liquor store. When the robbers take hostages and demand a police car so they can escape, Callahan drives his into the front of the store and uses the resulting chaos to gun them down. Callahan's superior, Captain Jerome McKay, angrily reprimands him for "excessive use of force", injuring the hostages, and causing $14,379 in damages; as punishment, Callahan is transferred to the Personnel department, where he is forced to participate in the interview process for promotions. He is dismayed to learn that under the mayor's new affirmative action rules, several of the promotions must go to women, including Kate Moore, a desk officer with no field experience.

The PRSF uses the stolen gas company van and uniforms to steal M72 LAW rockets, M16 rifles, a taser, and other weapons from a warehouse. DiGiorgio and another officer catch them in the act, but Maxwell fatally wounds DiGiorgio with a knife, runs the other cop over with the van, and kills one of his own followers despite her only having minor wounds. Callahan is transferred back to Homicide, but is distressed to find out that Moore is his new partner. While watching a U.S. Army demonstration of the LAW rocket on a firing range, Callahan notices Moore standing right behind the rocket and pulls her out of the way of potentially lethal backblast. Irritated by the incident, Callahan tells Moore he is doubtful of her ability to perform in dangerous situations and warns her that a failure in such an incident could endanger both their lives.

Callahan and Moore are leaving an autopsy at the Hall of Justice when a bomb explodes in the bathroom. The inspectors chase down and capture the bomber, and meet "Big" Ed Mustapha, leader of a black militant group to which the bomber formerly belonged. Although Callahan makes a deal with Mustapha for information, McKay arrests him and his followers for the PRSF's crimes, damaging Callahan's credibility. Callahan angrily refuses to participate in a televised press conference in which the publicity-seeking mayor intends to commend him and Moore for Mustapha's arrest; McKay then suspends Callahan and takes his badge. However, Moore informs Callahan that she will continue to help him in any way she can, and the two share drinks in a sign of mutual respect.

The PRSF ambushes the mayor's motorcade as he leaves a Giants game at Candlestick Park, killing his bodyguard and aide and taking him hostage with a ransom of $5 million. Callahan bails out Mustapha, who gives him the name of a priest who mentored Maxwell; Moore then saves Callahan's life when Wanda (disguised as a nun) tries to shoot him in the back. The priest reveals that the PRSF are squatting on Alcatraz Island. Callahan distracts the gang while Moore frees the mayor, but Maxwell kills her before they can get off the island. Callahan avenges Moore by cornering him in an old guard tower and blowing it up with a LAW rocket. Ignoring the mayor's profuse gratitude, Callahan abandons him and walks over to his partner's corpse as McKay arrives in a helicopter and announces to the deceased Maxwell that the SFPD will give in to all of his demands.

Cast

Production

Script 

The first script was written in 1974 by two young San Francisco-area film students, Gail Morgan Hickman and S.W. Schurr, with the title Moving Target. After seeing Dirty Harry and Magnum Force, the two fledgling writers decided to pen a screenplay of their own featuring the character of Inspector Harry Callahan. Inspired by the Patty Hearst kidnapping in 1974, the storyline had Inspector Harry Callahan going up against a violent militant group reminiscent of the Symbionese Liberation Army. In the script, the militants kidnap and ransom the mayor of San Francisco.

After the screenplay was finished, Hickman visited Eastwood's Carmel restaurant, The Hog's Breath Inn, and approached Eastwood's business partner, Paul Lippman, asking if he would give their effort to Eastwood. Lippman was initially hesitant, but finally agreed. Although Eastwood thought the script needed work, he liked the concept, particularly the priest with militant leanings and the portrayal of black militants, which was based on the Black Panther Party.

Warner Bros., meanwhile, eager to capitalize on the success of the two Dirty Harry films, had hired seasoned screenwriter Stirling Silliphant to write a new Harry Callahan story. Silliphant wrote a script called Dirty Harry and More, in which the Callahan character was teamed up with an Asian-American woman partner named More. Eastwood liked the woman-partner angle, but felt the script spent too much time on character and did not have enough action. Eastwood then showed the Hickman/Schurr script to Silliphant, and Silliphant agreed to rewrite it.

Silliphant wrote the script throughout late 1975 and early 1976 and delivered his draft to Eastwood in February 1976. While Eastwood approved, he believed the emphasis was still too much on the character relationships rather than the action, and was concerned the fans might not approve.  He then brought in screenwriter Dean Riesner, who had worked on the scripts of Dirty Harry and Coogan's Bluff, to do revisions.

Casting 
Recurring characters Lieutenant Bressler (Harry Guardino) and Frank DiGiorgio (Mitchum) reprise their roles for the last time in a Dirty Harry film. Bressler was Callahan's boss in the first film of the series; DiGiorgio appeared in the previous two, but dies in this film. A new character, Captain Jerome McKay (Dillman), was introduced as Callahan's superior officer. Dillman played a similar role, Captain Briggs, in Sudden Impact.

Albert Popwell also returns as a character in this film, having played the Bank Robber in the first film of the series and Sidney the pimp in Magnum Force.

The character of Kate Moore, Harry's female partner, went to Tyne Daly. Daly's casting was initially uncertain, given that she turned down the role three times. She objected to the way her character was treated in parts of the film and showed concern that two members of the police force falling in love on the job was problematic, given that they would be putting their lives in jeopardy by not reaching peak efficiency. Daly was permitted to read the drafts of the script developed by Riesner and had significant leeway in the development of her character, although after seeing the film at the premiere, was horrified by the extent of the violence. Regarding Callahan's relationship with Moore, Eastwood stated:

Filming 
When production began, the working title of the film was Dirty Harry III, in keeping with other sequels of the time. Eastwood felt that the film needed a title of its own, and in the middle of production came up with The Enforcer.

After his disputes with Ted Post on the set of the previous Dirty Harry installment, Eastwood fully intended to direct The Enforcer himself. Eastwood's replacement of Philip Kaufman on The Outlaw Josey Wales (and the consequent need to handle post-production on that film) left him without enough time to prepare himself to direct The Enforcer. As a result, Eastwood gave the director's chair to James Fargo, his longtime assistant director, who made his debut as a full director on this film. Eastwood had the final say on all the critical decisions, but since the two men were far more familiar with each other's working styles than Eastwood had been with Ted Post, they rarely butted heads during production.

Filming commenced in the San Francisco Bay area in the summer of 1976. Eastwood was initially still dubious about the quantity of his lines and preferred a less talkative approach, something perhaps embedded in him by Sergio Leone. The film ended up considerably shorter than the previous Dirty Harry films, and was cut to 95 minutes for its final running time.

The music score for The Enforcer was written by Jerry Fielding, making The Enforcer the only Dirty Harry film without a score by Lalo Schifrin. The film was originally intended to be the last Dirty Harry film of a trilogy. A poll conducted by Warner Bros. in 1983 led to the development of a fourth film, Sudden Impact, and the resurrection of the film series. Eastwood never intended to make more Dirty Harry films, but private agreements with the studio allowed him to do more "personal" films in exchange for doing the subsequent sequels.

Reception

Critical response 

Richard Eder of The New York Times was negative, stating, "Money, the big name of Clint Eastwood, a lot of gore and howling sirens and the urge to rail at various liberal notions are not enough to make even a passable movie out of 'The Enforcer.'" Roger Ebert of the Chicago Sun-Times was positive and called it "the best of the Dirty Harry movies at striking a balance between the action and the humor. Sometimes in the previous films we felt uneasy laughing in between the bloodshed, but this time the movie's more thoughtfully constructed and paced." Gene Siskel of the Chicago Tribune gave the film two stars out of four and wrote that "the major disappointment in 'The Enforcer' is its disjointed script with its relative absence of thrills." Another criticism he had was that Harry's opponents were now "cartoon idiots" in contrast with the memorable Scorpio from the first Dirty Harry film. Arthur D. Murphy of Variety indicated that the Dirty Harry "format seems to be falling apart at the seams," concluding, "The next project from this particular mold had better shape up or give up." Kevin Thomas of the Los Angeles Times called it "Clint Eastwood's third and arguably best 'Dirty Harry' movie," with "a good cast" and "unprecedented humor" that "results from the film's tonic, highly developed sense of the absurd that runs through its fast-paced mayhem." Gary Arnold of The Washington Post wrote that the film "lacks both the effective gimmicks and the slambang kinetic force of its predecessors. Elements that once generated some melodramatic heat have cooled into inside jokes and aged into venerable wheezes." Janet Maslin stated in Newsweek that "The Enforcer shows very little understanding of the charismatic single-mindedness that made Clint Eastwood's Inspector Harry Callahan such a crowd pleaser in the first place ... each of the two sequels – the first was Magnum Force – has paid less attention to Harry's righteous indignation than to the mayhem he generates. The gore has now become so gratuitous that Harry has begun to look like a trigger-happy fool."

Eastwood was named "Worst Actor of the Year" by the Harvard Lampoon, and the film was criticized for its level of violence.

Eastwood's performance in the third installment was overshadowed by positive reviews given to Daly as the strong-minded female cop, with which she would follow up  a similar role as Det. Mary Beth Lacey in the television series Cagney and Lacey. Daly received rave reviews, with Marjorie Rosen remarking that Malpaso "had invented a heroine of steel" and Jean Hoelscher of The Hollywood Reporter praising Eastwood for abandoning his ego in casting such a strong female actress in his film. Rotten Tomatoes retrospectively gave the film a score of 69% based on reviews from 35 critics, 24 of which were judged to be positive and 11 negative.

Box office 

Upon release in December 1976, The Enforcer was a major commercial success, grossing $8,851,288 in its first week, a record for a Clint Eastwood film at the time.

It grossed a total of $46,236,000 in the United States and Canada, making it the ninth-highest grossing film of 1976. Overall, this figure made it the most profitable of the Dirty Harry series for seven years until the release of Sudden Impact.

References

Bibliography

External links 

 
 
 
 
 

1976 films
1970s action thriller films
1970s vigilante films
1970s police procedural films
American action thriller films
American police detective films
American neo-noir films
American vigilante films
American sequel films
Alcatraz Island in fiction
Dirty Harry
Fictional portrayals of the San Francisco Police Department
Films about terrorism in the United States
Films set in San Francisco
Films set in the San Francisco Bay Area
Films shot in San Francisco
Warner Bros. films
Films with screenplays by Stirling Silliphant
Films scored by Jerry Fielding
Malpaso Productions films
Films with screenplays by Gail Morgan Hickman
1976 directorial debut films
Films directed by James Fargo
1970s English-language films
1970s American films